Koshi Province is the easternmost of the seven provinces established by the Constitution of Nepal, which was adopted on 20 September 2015. The province covers an area of 25,905 km2, about 17.5% of the country's total area. With the industrial city of Biratnagar as its capital, the province covers other major eastern towns including Birtamod, Birat Chowk, Damak, Dharan, Itahari, Triyuga and Mechinagar and includes several mountains including the Everest, Kangchenjunga, and Ama Dablam. Koshi River, the largest river of the nation, circumvents the province's western boundary. Adhering to the first-past-the-post voting system issued by the Constituency Delimitation Commission, Nepal, the province hosts 28 parliamentary seats and 56 provincial seats.

The province is bordered by the Tibet of China to the north, the Indian states of Sikkim and West Bengal to the east, and Bihar to the south, and Bagmati Province and Madhesh Province to the west. According to the 2021 Nepal census, there are around 5 million people in the province, with a population density of 190 per square kilometre. As per the 2011 Nepal census the province had around 4.5 million people.

Etymology
The province is named Koshi after the Kosi river, which is the largest in the country. On 1 March 2023 the former temporary name of the province, Province No. 1, was changed to Koshi Province. The Kosi river is significantly and culturally an important river of Nepal. The Kosi river is called Kausika in the Rigveda and Kausiki in the Mahabharata. The Kosi is associated with many ancient spiritual stories. It is mentioned in the Bal Kand section of Valmiki's Ramayana as the Kausiki who is the form assumed by Satyavati after her death. In the Ramayana Kausiki is mentioned as the younger sister of Ganga.

History

The most hilly and Himalayan part of Province was the area under the Limbuwan Kingdom, including Dhankuta, Okhaldhunga, and Udayapur.

In the beginning of the 7th century, when King Mung Mawrong Hang came to prominence in the terai lands of Limbuwan (present-day Sunsari, Morang and Jhapa area). He cleared much of the forest area in present-day Rangeli, east of Biratnagar, and built a town there. He named his Kingdom Morang after his name and rose to power.

Meanwhile, the Gorkha King Prithivi Narayan Shah was on a campaign to conquer all the hill kingdoms into his Empire (the Kingdom of Nepal). He attacked Limbuwan on two fronts. After the Limbuwan Gorkha War from 1771 to 1774 AD, the Limbu ministers of Morang, and Limbu rulers of the ten principalities came to an agreement with the King of Gorkha. With the Limbuwan Gorkha treaty of 1774, Limbuwan was annexed to the Kingdom of Nepal.
The term district has been used in various ways throughout the modern history of Nepal.
At the end of the Rana regime, Nepal was divided into 32 districts. Eastern Nepal (what is now Province No. 1) was composed of the following District 

Morang District(Including Sunsari District & Jhapa District)

Morang Distri ct: (including Jhapa, Sunsari, and Morang)
Udayapur District
Ilam District
Dhankuta District:( including Taplejung, Panchthar, Terhathum, Sankhuwasabha, and Dhankuta)
Bhojpur District (or "East No. 4": including Bhojpur and Khotang)
Okhaldhunga District (or "East No. 3": including Okhaldhunga and Solukhumbu)

In 1956, the Eastern districts of Nepal were grouped together into a region or kshetra called the Aruṇ Kshetra or Arun Region, after the Arun River which flows through it. The Arun Kshetra was made by combining the then five districts.
The five districts were:
 Biratnagar District: including Sunsari and Morang
 Dhankuta District: including Dhankuta and Sankhuwasabha
 Taplejung District: including Taplejung and Panchtharl
 Mechi District: including Ilam and Jhapa
 Bhojpur District: including Bhojpur and Khotang)

In 1962, the administrative system once again was changed, abolishing the kshetra system.  The country was now restructured into 75 development districts or jillā and those districts were grouped together into zones or añchal. In 1972, what is now called Province No. 1 was called the Eastern Development Region. It was composed of 16 districts, which were grouped into three zones.

At the cabinet meeting held on 17 January 2018, the city of Biratnagar was declared the interim capital of Province No. 1.  On 6 May 2019 it was declared the permanent capital by a vote of two-thirds of the provincial assembly's MLAs.

Geography 

Koshi Pradesh covers an area of 25,905 km2. The province has three-fold geographical division: Himalayan in the north, Hilly in the middle and Terai in the southern part of Nepal, varying between an altitude of 70 m and 8,848 m. Terai, extended from east to west, is made up of alluvial soil. To the west of Koshi River, in between Mahabharat Range and Churia Range, there elongates a valley called Inner Terai. Churai Range, Mahabharat Range and other hills of various heights, basins, tars, and valleys form the hilly region. Some parts of this region are favorable for agriculture but some other parts are not. The Himalayan region, in the north, consists of many mountains ranges. Mahalangur, Kumbhakarna, Umvek, Lumba Sumba and Janak being some of them. The highest mountain in the world, Mount Everest (8848.86 m); and the third highest mountain, Kangchenjunga (8598 m) also lie in this province.

Nepal's lowest point, Kechana Kawal at 70 m, is located in Jhapa District of this province. There are many river basins and gentle slopes as well. Chure, Mahabharat, many basins, tars, and valleys form the Terai region. Between the Churia and Mahabharat, a low land of inner Terai exists. The Koshi River flows through the region with its seven tributaries; Indrawati, Likhu, Tamur, Dudh Kosi, Arun, Tamakoshi and Bhote Koshi (Sunkoshi). Tundra vegetables, coniferous forests, deciduous monsoon forests, and sub-tropical evergreen woods are vegetations found here. Sub-tropical, temperate, sub-temperate, and alpine and tundra types of climates are found here.

Koshi Pradesh also includes the snow fall capped peaks including Mount Everest, Kangchenjunga, Makalu with Solukhumbu, Sankhuwasabha, and Taplejung districts towards the north, the jungle clad hill tracts of Okhaldhunga, Khotang, Bhojpur, Tehrathum, Ilam and Panchthar in the middle and the alluvial fertile plains of Udayapur, Sunsari, Morang and Jhapa. Province No. 1 includes places like Haleshi Mahadev Temple, Pathivara Temple and Barahachhetra, which are the famous religious shrines for Hindus.

Climate 
Climatic conditions of Nepal vary from one place to another in accordance with their geographical features. Koshi Pradesh has three geographical folds: the lowland of Terai, the hilly region, and the Himalayas' highlands. The low land altitude is 59 m, whereas the highest point is 8848 m.

In the north, summers are cool and winters severe, while in the south, summers are tropical and winters are mild. Climatically, the southern belt of the province, the Terai, experiences a warm and humid climate. Eastern Nepal receives approximately 2,500 millimeters of rain annually. Koshi Pradesh has five seasons: spring, summer, monsoon, autumn and winter.

Mountains 

The northern part of Koshi Pradesh has the highest mountain in the world. Here is a list of mountains in Koshi Pradesh.

Rivers
There are many rivers in the region that flow south from the Himalayas which are tributaries of other large rivers that join Ganga River (in India). Sapta Koshi or the Koshi is the main river of the region. Seven tributaries join the Koshi so it is called Saptkoshi.

The major rivers in the province are:
Mechi River
Kankai River
Koshi River (SaptaKoshi) :
Tamor
Arun River
Sun Koshi
Dudh Koshi
Likhu Khola
Tama Koshi
Indrawati River

Protected Areas
 Sagarmatha National Park –  (National Park)
 Makalu Barun National Park –  (National Park)
 Koshi Tappu Wildlife Reserve –  (Wildlife reserves)
 Kanchenjunga Conservation Area –  (Conservation areas)
 Gokyo Lake Complex –  (Ramsar Sites)
 Koshi Tappu Wildlife Reserve –  (Ramsar Sites)
 Mai Pokhari –  (Ramsar Sites)

Subdivisions
There are total of 137 local administrative units in this province, in which there is 1 metropolitan city, 2 sub-metropolitan cities, 46 municipalities and 88 rural municipalities.

Districts 
The province is made up of the 14 following districts:

Municipality 
Cities and villages are governed by municipalities in Nepal. A district may have one or more municipalities. Province No. 1 has two types of municipalities.
 Urban Municipality 
 Metropolitan city
 Sub-metropolitan city and
 Municipality
 Rural Municipality (Gaunpalika)

The government of Nepal has set out minimum criteria to meet city and towns. These criteria include a certain population, infrastructure, and revenues.

Administration 
The first provincial assembly elections in Nepal were held on 26 November and 7 December 2017.

After the results of the recent election in Koshi province the biggest party is CPN (UML) which won 51 of 93 seats; the second biggest party is Nepali Congress which won 21 seats; the third biggest party is CPN (Maoist Center) which won 15 seats in first Provincial Assembly election.

There are 56 FPTP and 37 PR seats in the province.

In a meeting on 17 January 2018 the Government of Nepal finalized the temporary capital of Province No. 1, and appointed Govinda Subba as the governor.

Sher Dhan Rai was elected as Chief Minister of Province No. 1 on 14 February 2018. He was a former Minister for Information and Communications. He was appointed as the chief minister, according to Article 168 (1) of the Constitution of Nepal.

Infrastructure

Health Care 
Koshi province stretches from Himalayan region to terai belt due to which health facilities are more viable in Terai than other parts. 

Koshi Province has 791 public health facilities Which includes 3 Hub hospitals ( BPKIHS, Koshi Hospital) , 18 Public Hospitals , 1 Regional Medical Store , 41 Primary health centre , 648 Health Post, 34 Urban health care centre, 41 community health units and so on.

Energy 
There are various power stations in Koshi province .

Mai Hydropower Station is one of station located in Illam and producing 22 MW energy & established in 2014.It is owned by Sanima Hydropower.

Puwa Khola Hydropower Station is located in Illam with capacity of 6.2 MW energy.It was established in 1999.It is owned by NEA

Chatara Hydropower Station is located in Sunsari District with production capacity of 3.2 MW energy and is owned by NEA. It was established in 1996.

Iwa Khola Hydropower Project was established in 
2018–19
ByRairang Hydropower Development Company Ltd with production capacity of 9.9 MW energy.

Upper Mai Hydropower Station is located in Illam and established by Mai Valley Hydropower P Ltd. in 2014 having capacity of 12 MW.

Pikhuwa Khola Hydropower Station is located in Bhojpur and established by Eastern Hydropower P Ltdin 2019 having capacity of 5 MW.

Hewa Khola A Hydropower Station is located in Pachthar and established by Panchthar Power Company Pvt. Ltd. in 2018 having capacity of 14.9 MW.

Jogmai Khola Hydropower Station is located in Illam and established by Sanvi Energy Pvt. Ltd. in 2014 having capacity of 7.6 MW.

Upper Puwa-1 Hydropower Station is located in Illam and established by Joshi Hydropower Co. P. Ltd in 2013 having capacity of 3 MW.

Upper Mai-C Hydropower Station is located in Illam and established by Mai Valley Hydropower P.L. in 2014 having capacity of 6.1 MW.

Kabeli B1 Hydropower Station is located in Pachthar and established by Arun Kabeli Power Limited. in 2019 having capacity of 25 MW.

Lower Hewa Hydropower Station is located in Pachthar and established by Mountain Hydro Nepal (P.) Ltd in 2017 having capacity of 21.6 MW.
Mai Cascade Hydropower Station is located in Illam and established by Himal Dolkha Hydropower Company Pvt Ltd in 2014 having capacity of 8 MW.

Puwa Khola-1 Hydropower Station is located in Illam and established by Puwa Khola – 1 Hydropower Pvt. Ltd in 2014 having capacity of 4 MW.

Solu Hydropower Station is located in Solukhumbu and established by Upper Solu Hydroelectric Company Pvt Ltd in 2016 having capacity of 23.5 MW.
Molun Khola Small Hydropower Station is located in Okhaldhunga and established by Molun Hydropower Co. Pvt. Ltd in 2019 having capacity of 7 MW.
Upper Khorunga Hydropower Station is located in Tehrathum and established by Terhathum Power Company Pvt. Ltd. in 2018 having capacity of 7.5 MW.
Super Mai Hydropower Station is located in Illam and established by Supermai Hydropower Pvt.Ltd. in 2020 having capacity of 7.8 MW.
Super Mai-A Hydropower Station is located in Illam and established by Sagarmatha Jalbidhyut Company P.Ltd. in 2020 having capacity of 9.6 MW.
Super Mai Khola Cascade Hydropower Station is located in Illam and established by Mai Khola Hydropower Pvt.Ltd. in 2020 having capacity of 3.8 MW.

Mai Khola Small Hydropower Station is located in Illam and established by Himal Dolkha Hydropower Co Ltd. in 2008 having capacity of 4.5 MW.

duhabi Multi-fuel diesel power station is present in Sunsari with production capacity of 39 MW and was commissioned in 1997.

Provincial Assembly 

The first meeting of the provincial assembly was held on 5 February 2018 in Biratnagar and was chaired by Om Prakash Sarbagi. Pradeep Kumar Bhandari was elected unopposed as the Speaker of the Provincial Assembly on 11 February 2018. Saraswoti Pokharel was also elected unopposed to the post of Deputy Speaker on 15 February 2018.

Transportation 
All provinces of Nepal except Madhesh Province have difficult geographic features. Only three districts out of fourteen of Province No. 1 falls in Terai and one district falls in inner Terai. Elevation from the lowest point of Nepal, Kechana (70 m above sea level) to the highest point of world, Everest (8848 m above sea level) lies in this province, so maintaining consistent road network is one of the most challenging. Despite of those challenges, all districts are connected via road networks. Air services are available. Rail services are under construction.

Roadways
Almost all districts are connected by roads in Koshi Pradesh, although some roads at high altitudes are not paved and conditions of those roads worsen during the rainy season. In the hills and mountain regions, the traffic is much lighter compared to Terai regions like Jhapa and Morang due to difficult terrain.

The main highways of Koshi Pradesh connect Terai to the high altitude regions. There are feeder roads too for inter-district and in-district travel.

 Mechi Highway: 268 km long two-lane freeway which connects Jhapa to Taplejung. The main destinations along the highway include Prithivinagar, Bhadrapur, Duhagadhi, Budhabare, Kanyam, and Phikkal.

 Koshi Highway: 159 km long Six-lane road which starts in Biratnagar and connects to Myanglung. Itahari, Dharan, Dhankuta, Bhedetar, Hile etc. are the destinations along the highway.
 Sagarmatha Highway: 265 km long two-lane highway which starts from Kadmaha of Madhesh Province and connects with Solukhumbu. Gaighat, Saune, etc. are the destinations along with the highway.

 Mahendra Highway is the major east–west highway of Nepal. It starts in Kakarbhitta in Koshi Pradesh.

Airways

Many domestic airports and air services are available in the region including one of the most geographically challenging airports, Lukla Airport.

Airports in Koshi Pradesh:
 Bhojpur Airport (Bhojpur)
 Biratnagar Airport (Biratnagar)
 Kangel Danda Airport (Kangel, Solukhumbu)
 Man Maya Airport (Khanidanda, Khotang)
 Thamkharka Airport (Khotang Bazar)
 Lamidanda Airport (Lamidanda, Khotang)
 Tenzing-Hillary Airport (Lukla, Solukhumbu)
 Phaplu Airport (Phaplu, Solukhumbu)
 Rumjatar Airport (Rumjatar, Okhladhunga)
 Syangboche Airport (Syangboche, Solukhumbu)
 Taplejung Airport (Taplejung)
 Tumlingtar Airport (Tumlingtar, Sankhuwasabha)
 Bhadrapur Airport (Bhadrapur, Jhapa)

Railways

There is a 13 km railway track which has been laid in Nepal by Indian Railways is connected to Bathnaha railway station. Bathnaha is a village situated at Araria district of Bihar state of India. A custom yard station has been built both side of the border on Bathnaha–Katahari railway section. Katahari is at distance of 18 km from Bathnaha Railway Station. Itahari will be further connected with Katahari which is 20km at distance from Biratnagar (Katahari).

Economy
Koshi being 3rd largest economy of Nepal , contributes 15% to national GDP.Koshi's GDP growth rate was estimated to be 6.5% in fiscal year 2018/19.
Population under absolute poverty in Koshi is 12.4%, and the multidimensional poverty rate is 19.7%.
The major contributor in economy of Koshi are:

Agriculture
Agriculture accounts for 38% of Koshi's GDP and is the main source of livelihood for 75% of the population.
The province has 714 registered industries, with Agriculture and forestry industry having the highest number of registered industries 114  (15.96%).
Koshi contributes 22% of the total paddy production of Nepal and 29.3% of the national maize production.

Tourism
The province is rich in natural beauty and attractions.There are various places to visit in Koshi province
Mount Everest
Mount Everest is Earth's highest mountain above sea level, located in the Mahalangur Himal sub-range of the Himalayas. The China–Nepal border runs across its summit point. Its elevation of 8,848.86 m was most recently established in 2020 by the Chinese and Nepali authorities.

Sagarmatha National park
Sagarmatha is an exceptional area with dramatic mountains, glaciers and deep valleys, dominated by Mount Everest, the highest peak in the world (8,848 m). Several rare species, such as the Snow leopard and the Lesser panda, are found in the park. The presence of the Sherpas, with their unique culture, adds further interest to this site.

Koshi Tappu Wildlife Reserve
Koshi Tappu Wildlife Reserve is the first Ramsar site of Nepal largely situated 
in the flood plain area of the Koshi River. The reserve is the only prime habitat 
for Wild water buffalo, rich in aquatic fauna and hotspot for migratory birds. 
Management is committed to conserve its biodiversity for the interest of present 
and future generations.

Sports 
Koshi province has wide audience and sportsperson in the Province. Also, It has been a pioneer in organising night matches. Inaruwa, sunsari had organised first night cricket in Nepal. Similarly, First night football was organised in Duhabi, Sunsari in 31 march 2018.

Also, the provincial teams take part in various games inside and outside Nepal.The team also comprises Men as well as women.The overall sports in province is  administered by Province 1 Sports Department.

There are numerous stadium in Koshi are:

✓Domalal Rajbanshi Stadium, Birtamode,Jhapa

✓Inaruwa Stadium, Inaruwa, Sunsari

✓Itahari Regional Stadium, Itahari, Sunsari

✓Sahid Rangasala, Biratnagar 

✓Tharuhat Stadium, Gaighat

Major Football cups includes:

✓Birat Gold Cup Biratnagar 

✓Jhapa Gold Cup, Jhapa

✓Budha Subba Gold Cup, Dharan

✓Manmohan Duhabi Gold Cup, Duhabi 

✓Madan Bhandari Invitational Itahari Gold Cup, Itahari

✓Udayapur Gold Cup, Udayapur

Ilam Municipality

Demographics

Total population of Koshi Pradesh (according to 2011 Nepal census) is 4,543,943 in which female comprises 52% (2,368,407) of the total population. There are 992,445 households

Religion

Hinduism is the major religion of the province.  Kirat Mundhum is the second major religion of the province. 67% of the total population are Hindus, 17% are Kirantis, 9% are Buddhists, 4% are Muslims, and others make up 1%.

Ethnicity

The province is very ethnically diverse. The largest group is the Chhetri, making up 14.58% of the population. Followed by Madheshi with (14.26%). Next is Hill Brahmin (11.98%). Other Khas Arya groups are the Kami (3.27%) and Damai (1.78%). The Janajati groups are the Rai (11.26%), Limbu (8.01%), Tamang (4.62%), Magar (4.13%), Newar (3.68%), Sherpa (1.40%) and Gurung (1.36%). Some Terai groups include Tharu (4.10%), Musalman (3.55%), Rajbanshi (2.47%), Musahar (1.35%), Yadav (1.30%) and Santal (1.11%).

Language

Nepali language is lingua franca of the province and is the mother tongue of 42.53% of the population. Maithili is spoken by 20.46.1% of the population and is the second largest language. 7.27% of the population speaks Limbu, 3.89% Tamang, 3.87% Tharu, 3.20% Magar, 2.88% Bantawa, 2.0% Urdu, 2.66% Rajbanshi, 2.63% Rai, 1.69% Newar, 1.65% Chamling, 1.47% Sherpa, 1.07% Santali.

The Language Commission of Nepal has recommended Limbu and Maithili as official language in the province. The commission has also recommended Tharu, Tamang, Magar, Bantawa, Urdu, Rajbanshi, Nepal Bhasa, Chamling, Sherpa and Santhali to be additional official languages, for specific regions and purposes in the province.

Education
71.22% of the total population of the province can read and write mean educated.

Notable people 
Dr. Sanduk Ruit- God of Sight 

KP Sharma Oli, Former Prime minister 

Bidya Devi Bhandari, Current President of Nepal 

Pramod Kharel, Singer 

Rachana Rimal, Singer 

Namrata Shrestha , Actress & Model 

Manita Devkota, Miss Nepal Universe 2018

Rajendra Prasad Lingden, chairman of RPP

Malvika Subba , Miss Nepal 2002

Malina Joshi, Miss Nepal 2011

See also
Provinces of Nepal
List of districts in Nepal

References 

2015 establishments in Nepal
 
1
States and territories established in 2015